William Alexander Stewart (September 12, 1930 – March 25, 2002) was an American linguist specializing in creoles, known particularly for his work on African American Vernacular English.

Biography
Stewart was born in Honolulu, Hawaii to Scottish parents, and grew up speaking four languages (English, Spanish, Portuguese and Hawaiian).
At the age of 8, he moved with his family to California.
His parents were killed in a car crash one year later, and he was raised by his father's parents.
He served as an army translator before enrolling at the University of California, Los Angeles, where he obtained his Bachelor's and Master's degrees.

Work
Working for the Center for Applied Linguistics, Stewart undertook pioneering work on creoles in the Caribbean in the early 1960s.
In 1965, he discovered that reading problems of some African-American children were caused not by vocabulary or pronunciation, but by differences between the grammar of African American Vernacular English and standard English. In the late 1960s, he explored the sociolinguistics of multilingualism, introducing the notions of polycentric languages, autonomy and heteronomy.

See also

 Standard language
 Language planning
 Post-creole continuum
 Monogenetic theory of pidgins
 List of diglossic regions

References

External links

1930 births
2002 deaths
Linguists from the United States
Sociolinguists
University of California, Los Angeles alumni
City University of New York faculty
20th-century linguists
American people of Scottish descent
People from Honolulu